Slow is the eleventh album by guitarist/vocalist Richie Kotzen.

Track listing

In Russian version "All I Can" is listed as bonus track 14.

Personnel
Richie Kotzen – all instruments
Richie Kotzen – recorder
Tom Baker – mastering
Bruce Martin - Photographs
Taka Shibayama (Paper Land) - Art Layout

2001 albums
Shrapnel Records albums